Rami Ibrahim (born February 6, 1988) is an Egyptian basketball player for Al Ittihad and the Egyptian national team, where he participated at the 2014 FIBA Basketball World Cup.

References

1988 births
Living people
Egyptian men's basketball players
Power forwards (basketball)
Small forwards
2014 FIBA Basketball World Cup players